Saint John the Baptist (preaching) is a bronze sculpture, by Auguste Rodin.

After the controversy of his Age of Bronze, Rodin began modeling the larger than life figure in 1877.
He showed a plaster model at the Salon of 1880.

Rodin described to  how he was inspired to create this sculpture by an Italian peasant named Pignatelli.

Versions
Reduced size examples were cast between 1878 and 1907. The Walking Man is a version of the figure without the head and arms.

Examples are in the collections of: Musée d'Orsay, Musée du Luxembourg, Musée Rodin,  the Tate Museum, Victoria and Albert Museum, the Metropolitan Museum of Art, the Norton Simon Museum, California Palace of the Legion of Honor, the Glenkiln Sculpture Park, and the Saint Louis Art Museum.

See also
List of sculptures by Auguste Rodin

References

External links
Link to Saint John the Baptist  on the official website of the Musée Rodin.
Art in the Christian Tradition
Rodin: The B. Gerald Cantor Collection, a full text exhibition catalog from The Metropolitan Museum of Art, which contains material on Saint John the Baptist

1877 sculptures
Bronze sculptures in Paris
Bronze sculptures in London
Bronze sculptures in the United States
Sculptures of the Norton Simon Museum
Sculptures of the Musée Rodin
Sculptures depicting John the Baptist
Nude sculptures
Outdoor sculptures
Sculptures by Auguste Rodin
Statues in France